Raimundo Blanco Toranzo (born 1 October 1918 – 28 June 1984) was a Spanish footballer who played as a forward. He was best known for his stint with Sevilla in the 1940s.

Playing career
Raimundo spent his entire career with  Sevilla from 1935 to 1945, before retiring due to injuries. Manager Pepe Brand incorporated Raimundo into Sevilla's first team in 1935. He was part of a renowned offensive line at Sevilla called the "Stuka", alongside Pepillo, José López, Campanal I, and Rafael Berrocal.

After he retired from playing football, Raimundo became a graphic artist. He died in 1984.

References

External links

1918 births
1984 deaths
Footballers from Seville
Spanish footballers
Association football forwards
Sevilla FC players
La Liga players